San Ignacio District may refer to:
 San Ignacio District, Acosta, Acosta Canton, Costa Rica
 San Ignacio District, Paraguay
 San Ignacio District, Peru

District name disambiguation pages